R. V. Swaminathan( R.V.S)  was a former Central Minister born in melathiruthi muttathur paganeri valkottai nadu (sivagangai), Freedom fighter, Indian politician and former Member of the Legislative Assembly of Tamil Nadu and Member of Parliament elected from Tamil Nadu.
 
He was elected to the Lok Sabha from Madurai constituency as an Indian National Congress candidate in 1971 and 1977 elections. In 1980 he was elected from Sivaganga (Lok Sabha constituency)

He was elected to the Tamil Nadu legislative assembly from Sivaganga constituency as an Indian National Congress candidate in 1952 and 1962 elections. he is having three sons one of his son r v s prem kumar worked as Tamil Nadu president for youth congress

References

External links 
 http://164.100.47.132/LssNew/biodata_1_12/2268.htm 7th Lok Sabha Members Bioprofile

Indian National Congress politicians from Tamil Nadu
Living people
India MPs 1971–1977
India MPs 1977–1979
India MPs 1980–1984
Lok Sabha members from Tamil Nadu
Politicians from Madurai
Year of birth missing (living people)